Estonia has participated at the Youth Olympic Games since the inaugural 2010 Games and every edition after that.

Summer Games

Medals by summer sport

Winter Games

Medals by winter sport

List of medalists

Summer Games

Mixed-NOCs medals

Winter Games

Mixed-NOCs medals

Competitors

Summer Games

Winter Games

*One athlete competed in both nordic combined and ski jumping

Flag bearers
These are the Estonian flag bearers in the opening ceremony:

See also
Estonia at the Olympics
Estonia at the Paralympics
Estonia at the European Youth Olympic Festival

External links
Estonian Olympic Committee
Youth Olympics at Estonian Olympic Committee

 
Youth sport in Estonia
Nations at the Youth Olympic Games